Serkan Bekiroğlu (born 26 January 1979) is a Turkish retired professional footballer who played as a centreback, most notably for the Turkish club Adanaspor in the Süper Lig.

Professional career
A youth product of Adanaspor, Bekiroğlu made his professional debut in a 4-1 Turkish Cup loss to Galatasaray on 23 January 1999. He made his Süper Lig debut in a 1–1 tie with Bursaspor on 23 May 1999.

International career
Bekiroğlu made one appearance for the Turkey U21s in a 2-2 friendly match against the Israel U21s on 5 April 2000.

Personal life
Bekiroğlu's brother, Volkan Kürşat Bekiroğlu, was also a professional footballer in Turkey.

References

External links
 
 
 

1979 births
Living people
People from Kadirli
Turkish footballers
Turkey youth international footballers
Adanaspor footballers
Karşıyaka S.K. footballers
Adana Demirspor footballers
Antalyaspor footballers
Kocaelispor footballers
Kayserispor footballers
Giresunspor footballers
Süper Lig players
TFF First League players
TFF Second League players
Association football defenders